Laramie station could refer to:

 Laramie station (CTA Green Line)
 Laramie station (CTA Blue Line)